The Staatsmijn Hendrik was a Dutch coal mine located in Brunssum. The mine was in operation from 1915 until 1963, when it was integrated with the Staatsmijn Emma.

External links
 http://citg.tudelft.nl/?id=18387 Coal Mining in the Netherlands (Delft University of Technology)

Coal mines in the Netherlands
Buildings and structures in Limburg (Netherlands)
Brunssum